Friedrich Wilhelm Gustav Bruhn (11 November 1853 – 1927) was a German inventor.

Life 
Bruhn invented modern taximeter in Berlin. He worked for German company Westendarp & Pieper Hamburg. In 1920 he became leader of this company.
Bruhn was married and had three children. His daughter Adele married architect Ludwig Mies van der Rohe. His son Wolfgang Bruhn was an art historian.

Literature 

Zeitschrift für das gesamte Local- und Straßenbahn-Wesen, Bde. 8–10, Bergmann 1889, S. 158.
 Der Motorwagen. Automobiltechnische Zeitschrift, 25:1922, S. 123.
 Zeitschrift für Flugtechnik und Motorluftschifffahrt, Bd. 9:1918, S. XXIII

External links 
 Depatisnet:Bibliographische Daten (Deutsches Patent und Markenamt

References 

20th-century German inventors
Businesspeople from Lübeck
1853 births
1927 deaths